Ari Arthur Hoogenboom (November 28, 1927 – October 25, 2014) was professor emeritus of history at Brooklyn College at the City University of New York. He was a scholar of the Gilded Age, particularly regarding the life and presidency of Rutherford B. Hayes.

Life and career
Hoogenboom grew up in the Queens borough of New York City, where he graduated from John Adams High School. He later earned a bachelor's degree from Atlantic Union College. There, he met and married his wife Olive, with whom he would later collaborate on several books. He went to graduate school at Columbia University, where he earned his MA and PhD, and was a student of David Herbert Donald. He taught history from 1956-58 at the University of Texas at El Paso, and from 1958-68 at Pennsylvania State University. He was awarded a Guggenheim Fellowship in 1965. From 1968 to 1998 he taught at Brooklyn College.

After his retirement from Brooklyn College, Hoogenboom authored Rutherford B. Hayes: One of the Good Colonels, and Gustavus Vasa Fox of the Union Navy: A Biography, about Assistant Secretary of the Navy Gustavus Fox. He worked with his wife Olive on a book that she was writing, Washington Women: The Woodbury Sisters.

Death
Hoogenboom died in 2014, aged 86, from complications of mesothelioma.

Bibliography

References

External links
Booknotes interview with Hoogenboom on Rutherford B. Hayes: Warrior & President, July 2, 1995
Life Portrait of Rutherford B. Hayes from C-SPAN's American Presidents: Life Portraits series, which heavily featured Hoogenboom

1927 births
2014 deaths
People from Richmond Hill, Queens
Brooklyn College faculty
University of Texas at El Paso faculty
Pennsylvania State University faculty
Columbia University alumni
Rutherford B. Hayes
American Unitarians
Deaths from mesothelioma
Deaths from cancer in New York (state)
John Adams High School (Queens) alumni
Historians from New York (state)